Arthur Leo Guepe (January 28, 1915 – November 4, 2001) was an American football player and coach.  He served as the head coach at the University of Virginia from 1946 to 1952 and Vanderbilt University from 1953 to 1962, compiling a career college football record of 86–71–9.

Playing and assistant coaching career
Guepe played quarterback at Marquette University from 1934 to 1936 in a backfield that included two-time All-American Ray Buivid, Ray Sonnenberg, and Arthur's twin brother, Albert Guepe.  The Golden Avalanche compiled records of 7–1 in 1935 and 7–2 in 1936, the latter season concluding with a 16–6 loss to Sammy Baugh and TCU in the 1937 Cotton Bowl Classic. Guepe and his twin brother, Al, starred for Marquette from 1933 to 1936. In the TCU game, Guepe raced a punt back 60 yards for the first touchdown in Cotton Bowl history to give Marquette an early lead. After graduation, Guepe served one season as freshmen football and basketball coach at Marquette, and then moved to the University of Virginia as an assistant football coach from 1938 to 1942.  Guepe served in the United States Navy during World War II and played one season in 1943 for the Iowa Pre-Flight Seahawks football team.

Head coaching career
Guepe was the head coach of the Virginia Cavaliers football program from 1946 to 1952, having compiled a 47–17–2 (.727) record. His final three years were his best, winning eight games in each of those seasons.  His '51 team finished 8–1 and ranked 13th in the nation.

Vanderbilt University lured Guepe from Virginia in 1953 and he coached the Commodores for ten seasons (1953–1962).  Guepe's 1955 Vandy team, beat 8th-ranked Auburn in the Gator Bowl and finished 8–3.  His Vandy teams won more Southeastern Conference games (19) than any Commodore coach before or since.

Upon retiring from coaching after the 1962 season, Guepe said matter-of-factly and without bitterness: "There is no way you can be Harvard Monday through Friday and try to be Alabama on Saturday."  His message to the Vanderbilt chancellor and trustees was unambiguous.  To be competitive in the arena of big-time college football, Vanderbilt would have to relax some of its high standards of admissions and academic eligibility.  His son, Arthur A. Guepe, played football at Vanderbilt from 1961 to 1963.

Later life and death
Guepe served as the Ohio Valley Conference's first commissioner from 1963 to 1975.  Guepe died on November 4, 2001 at a nursing home in Florida.

Head coaching record

References

1915 births
2001 deaths
American  football quarterbacks
Iowa Pre-Flight Seahawks football players
Marquette Golden Avalanche football coaches
Marquette Golden Avalanche football players
Vanderbilt Commodores athletic directors
Vanderbilt Commodores football coaches
Vanderbilt Commodores football players
Virginia Cavaliers football coaches
Ohio Valley Conference commissioners
United States Navy personnel of World War II
Sportspeople from Milwaukee
Players of American football from Milwaukee